Belfast West can refer to:

The western part of Belfast.
Belfast West (Assembly constituency)
Belfast West (Northern Ireland Parliament constituency)
Belfast West (UK Parliament constituency)